David Coren (8 June 1917 – 14 January 2011) was an Israeli politician who served as a member of the Knesset for the Alignment between 1969 and 1977.

Biography
Born in Jerusalem in 1917, Coren was educated at the Hebrew Gymnasium in his home city, before studying at a Teachers Seminary in Ramat Rachel and for a year at the Hebrew University of Jerusalem. Between 1938 and 1939 he worked as a labourer at the Dead Sea Works and Sedom, and was one of the founders of kibbutz Beit HaArava in 1939. He later became a member of Kibbutz Gesher HaZiv in 1949, where he lived until his death.

After Israeli independence Coren worked as an education officer in the Nahal, and between 1959 and 1961 served as head of the Youth and Nahal Section of the Ministry of Defense. He also headed the Administration section of the Israeli Air Force. In 1968 he became head of the Sulam Tzur Regional Council, but left the post before the end of the year.

In 1969 he was elected to the Knesset on the Alignment list. He was re-elected in 1973, but lost his seat in the 1977 elections. He became head of Sulam Tzur Regional Council again in 1979, serving until 1981. From 1979 until 1980 he chaired the Union for Developing the Western Galilee, and from 1981 until 1983 chaired the Friends of Nahariya Regional Hospital. Between 1982 and 1991 he was deputy head of Mateh Asher Regional Council, also serving as chairman of the Western Galilee College between 1985 and 2003.

References

External links
 

1917 births
2011 deaths
People from Jerusalem
Jews in Mandatory Palestine
Jews in Ottoman Palestine
Hebrew University of Jerusalem alumni
Israeli civil servants
Jewish Israeli politicians
Kibbutzniks
Mayors of regional councils in Israel
Alignment (Israel) politicians
Members of the 7th Knesset (1969–1974)
Members of the 8th Knesset (1974–1977)